Lost Prophet is a 1992 American horror film directed by Michael de Avila and starring James Burton, Zandra Huston, Drew Morone and James Tucker.

Cast
James Burton as Jim
Zandra Huston as Kym
Drew Morone as Real Estate Agent / Mick Prophet
James Tucker as Kid
Steven Tucker as Kid's Brother
Shannon Goldman as Park Patrolman
Larry O'Neil as Punk No. 1
Christian Urich as Punk No. 2
Sophia Ramos as Punk No. 3

References

External links

American horror films
1990s English-language films
1990s American films